Zhao Lin is the name of:

Zhao Yan (Later Liang) (died 923), Later Liang politician known as Zhao Lin during his youth
Zhao Lin (politician) (1906–2003), People's Republic of China politician
Zhao Lin (footballer) (born 1966), retired Chinese association footballer

See also
Lin Zhao (1932–1968), Chinese dissident